Blue v Ashley [2017] EWHC 1928 is an English contract law case, concerning the objective question of whether there is a contract.

Facts 
Two men were drinking and talking about business in the Horse and Groom pub at 128 Great Portland Street, London. Blue was told by Mike Ashley that if he managed to make the shares of Sports Direct International Plc reach £8, he would receive a bonus of £15 million. Blue then claimed this was a binding contract, and brought a claim.

Judgment
The High Court held that there was no binding contract because, at the time, nobody thought that the offer was genuine. Several elements were taken into account: the tone, the language, the setting and the purpose of the meeting. Leggatt J said the following:

See also

English contract law

Notes

References

English contract case law